Valantina Abu Oqsa is a Palestinian actress, theater director, poet and playwright.

Early life 
She was born in Mi'ilya village, in the Upper Galilee, north of Israel, on December 3, 1967. She lives in Haifa with her husband and children.

Career 

Valantina is a member of the Managing Committee of the Tenth International Women Playwrights Conference (WPIC) in Cape Town. In 1986, she started her career in theater with Al Hakawati theater Group in Jerusalem after a year and a half of studying theater in Tel Aviv and Jerusalem. At the theater, she is an editor, writer, director and producer. She participated in theatrical productions in Palestine, and performed in many cities in Europe, the United States and Arab countries, in several languages. She is one of the co-founders of the Palestinian theater League in Jerusalem.

On April 9, 2002, during the Battle of Jenin, a group of Palestinian activists tried to deliver supplies and medicine to the Jenin Refugee Camp. Valantina was among them and was shot in the left arm by an Israeli soldier, and as a result completely lost the use of her left elbow. She became known as the "Struggler artist" to Palestinians.

Plays

Actress 

 The Youbeel
 I'm Free...
 Kofr Shamma
 Natreen Faraj (Waiting for Godou)
 Kharbasheh fi Mahatta (A Mess in a Station)
 Al Aydi Al Qathera (The Dirty Hands)
 Bait As Sayyeda” (The House of Bernarda Alba)
 La…Lam Yamot” (No... He Did Not Die)
 The musical theater play “Gilgamesh did not die” (adapted from the Greek legend Gilgamesh)
 Blood Wedding
 Mahatta

Writer and director

 Co-directed and co-wrote Kharbasheh fi Mahatta (A Mess in a Station)
 Wrote and directed The Dream.
 Adapted and directed Shababeek Al-Ghazala (Windows of The Deer)
 Wrote and Directed puppet show Nus Nseis
 Established and managed the Project “Child Artist” in Haifa 2001-2005
 Conducted many theater workshops for children and youth in several cities in Palestine.

Theater festivals
 the first Palestinian theater Festival (Kharbasheh fi Mahatta)
 Rooted Moon International theater Festival (The Dream) 
 Amman International theater Festival - Amman, Jordan (Mahataa)  
 Qirtaj International theater Festival - Qirtaj, Tunisia. (Blood Wedding)    
 International Women Playwrights Conference (WPIC) in  Stockholm

Poetry

Valantina has written poetry since 1981. Her first poem was published in 1984, in Al Etihad. She had ten of her poems published in various Palestinian newspapers and in 1999 she published her first poetry book, فالنتينا أبو عُقصة.

Film and television

References

Sources 
 Egypt Independent Article
 Arabic Literature 
 Arab Women Media

21st-century Palestinian actresses
Palestinian dramatists and playwrights
Palestinian film actresses
Palestinian stage actresses
Living people
1967 births
20th-century Palestinian actresses
20th-century Palestinian women writers
21st-century Palestinian women writers
Palestinian women poets
20th-century Palestinian poets
21st-century Palestinian poets
Women dramatists and playwrights
20th-century dramatists and playwrights
21st-century dramatists and playwrights